The 1932–33 Scottish Second Division was won by Hibernian who, along with second placed Queen of the South, were promoted to the First Division. Armadale and Bo'ness were expelled after they were unable to complete all their games, with their records being expunged.

Table

References 

 Scottish Football Archive

Scottish Division Two seasons
2
Scot